Sabah Abdul-Jalil (1 July 1951 – 28 February 2021) was an Iraqi coach and football midfielder, who last coached Al-Quwa Al-Jawiya.

He died from COVID-19 during the COVID-19 pandemic in Iraq.

Career statistics

International goals
Scores and results list Iraq's goal tally first, score column indicates score after each Abdul-Jalil goal.

Managerial statistics

Honours

Club
Al-Zawraa
 Iraqi Premier League: 2000–01

Al-Quwa Al-Jawiya
 Iraqi Premier League: 2004–05

References

External links
 
 تعرف إلى المسيرة المميزة للنجم العراقي الذي سرقته كورونا - winwin.com

1951 births
2021 deaths
Iraqi footballers
Iraq international footballers
Association football midfielders
Amanat Baghdad players
1976 AFC Asian Cup players
Iraqi football managers
Olympique de Médéa managers
Al-Zawraa SC managers
Al-Quwa Al-Jawiya managers
Deaths from the COVID-19 pandemic in Iraq